The 2019 African Games women's football tournament was the 5th edition of the African Games women's football tournament. The women's football tournament was held as part of the 2019 African Games between 17–29 August 2019. Under-20 national teams took part in the tournament. Nigeria defeated Cameroon in the final on penalties to win the tournament. Morocco defeated Algeria to win the bronze medal.

Zambia had to withdraw from the competition due to issues with visa letters.

Teams
CAF selected representative teams from nations that had participated in the 2018 Africa Women Cup of Nations.

 (hosts)

Group stage

Group A

Group B

Knockout stage

Semi-finals

Third-place playoff

Final

References

External links
African Games (Football) Event Overview Women's

Women's
African Games
African Games, women's